Death Is This Communion (stylized as Death•Is•This•Communion•) is the fourth studio album by American heavy metal band High on Fire. It was released on September 10, 2007 in Europe and September 18 in the United States. The first pressing includes a bonus DVD featuring in-studio footage of the making of the album. It is the first album to feature Jeff Matz on bass guitar. Frontman Matt Pike noted that the album's lyrics were influenced by David Icke, H. P. Lovecraft, and the Bible.

The album has received generally good reviews, with an average rating of 80 on Metacritic.
It was named the third-best album of the year by Revolver. Total Guitar named it fourth in their "50 Best Guitar Albums of the Year". It came in at number 9 in Metal Hammers best of 2007 list.

Track listing
All tracks written by High on Fire.

Credits
Matt Pike – guitar, vocals
Jeff Matz – bass
Des Kensel – drums
Jack Endino – production, engineering and mixing
Alan Douches – mastering
Arik Roper – album cover

References

2007 albums
Relapse Records albums
High on Fire albums
Albums produced by Jack Endino